Adam Keefe (born April 26, 1984) is a Canadian former professional ice hockey forward who last played for, and captained, the Belfast Giants of the Elite Ice Hockey League (EIHL). Keefe announced his intention to retire from playing in 2017 and take up the position as Belfast Giants head coach, replacing Derrick Walser.

He appeared sporadically on the ice as injury cover during the 2017-18 EIHL season before retiring completely in 2018.

He is the younger brother of former Tampa Bay Lightning player and current head coach of the Toronto Maple Leafs in the National Hockey League, Sheldon Keefe.

Keefe is also one of Pete Russell's assistant coaches within the Great Britain set-up, along with Corey Neilson.

Career statistics

References

External links

1984 births
Living people
Belfast Giants players
Grand Rapids Griffins players
Great Britain men's national ice hockey team coaches
Kitchener Rangers players
Manitoba Moose players
San Antonio Rampage players
Sudbury Wolves players
Toledo Storm players
Toledo Walleye players
Victoria Salmon Kings players
Ice hockey people from Ontario
Canadian expatriate ice hockey players in Northern Ireland
Canadian ice hockey right wingers
Canadian ice hockey coaches
Canadian expatriate ice hockey players in the United States